James George Crichton (June 4, 1893 – March 5, 1954) was a United States Republican politician who served in the California State Assembly for the 34th district from 1943 to 1951.

Crichton was born in Eureka, California.  During World War I he served in the United States Army.

References

1893 births
United States Army personnel of World War I
Democratic Party members of the California State Assembly
1954 deaths